Katharina Otto-Bernstein is a German-American filmmaker and producer. She is best known for The Price of Everything, Mapplethorpe: Look at the Pictures, Absolute Wilson, When Night Falls Over Moscow, The Need for Speed and Beautopia, as well as the author of an intimate memoir of theatre and opera director Robert Wilson, Absolute Wilson - The Biography .

Life and education
Otto-Bernstein (née Otto) was born in Hamburg, Germany. After attending St. Clare’s Hall in Oxford, England, Otto-Bernstein earned her bachelor's degree from Columbia College and her MFA in Film from Columbia University Film School.

Otto-Bernstein is married to New York art dealer Nathan A. Bernstein. They have two children: Nicholas and Jonathan.

Career
As an undergraduate Otto-Bernstein worked for Town & Country magazine and wrote a lifestyle column for German Vogue. While enrolled in the Columbia University graduate film program, she was hired by British director Don Boyd (Aria, Twenty-One, My Kingdom) in 1989 to work on the East-West thriller entitled The Berlin Project. Once the production crew arrived in the divided capital, Otto-Bernstein became a witness to the fall of the Berlin Wall and the unification of East and West Germany. This gave Otto-Bernstein the incentive to direct the television documentary, Coming Home (1990), dealing with the re-unification of German families, and compile the interview collection, In the Shadow of the Wall, featuring interviews with East German personalities, including intelligence agents Günter Guillaume and Ruth Kuczynski (Red Sonja).

Upon her return to the US, Otto-Bernstein directed the comedy, The Second Greatest Story Ever Told (1992), starring Mira Sorvino and Malcolm McDowell; the television documentary, The Need for Speed (1993); and the American segments of the documentaries When Night Falls Over Moscow - Arms Dealing in the Former Soviet Union and The Industrialists Hall of Fame (1993).

Otto-Bernstein's Beautopia premiered at the Sundance Film Festival in 1998. The film probes the dark side of modeling and features fashion icons such as Claudia Schiffer, Kate Moss, Cindy Crawford, Naomi Campbell, Karl Lagerfeld, and Calvin Klein. Beautopia was the Grand Prize Nominee at Sundance and won the Silver Hugo at the Chicago International Film Festival. Janet Maslin of The New York Times called the film “a terrific and lively feminist analysis.”

In 1998, Otto-Bernstein met American theatre and opera director Robert Wilson (Einstein on the Beach, Black Rider, Lohengrin) at a cocktail party. This marked the beginning of a seven-year collaboration on the internationally acclaimed biopic, Absolute Wilson. The film features prominent collaborators such as Philip Glass, David Byrne, Tom Waits, Jessye Norman, and literary icon Susan Sontag in one of her last interviews. Absolute Wilson premiered to great critical acclaim at the 2006 Berlin International Film Festival and became an international festival sensation, earning the prestigious Art Film of the Year award from Art Basel. Kirk Honeycutt of The Hollywood Reporter wrote in his review: “An artist who operates on such a groundbreaking, international level as Robert Wilson deserves a documentary as good as Absolute Wilson.” A. O. Scott of The New York Times noted: “ Absolute Wilson makes you wish you had been there. Ms. Otto-Bernstein has performed heroic work."
 
In 2006, Otto-Bernstein published Absolute Wilson: The Biography (Prestel, Random House). She also penned the chapter “Absolute Watermill” for The Watermill Center – Robert Wilson’s Legacy (2011, Daco-Verlag, Stuttgart), and her short story "Dog Days" appeared in No Better Friend: Celebrities and the Dogs They Love, a collection of intimate essays edited by Elke Gazzara.

In 2013, Otto-Bernstein served as dramaturge on choreographer Karole Armitage's (Tony Award nomination for Hair) ballet, Fables for Global Warming.

In 2016, Mapplethorpe: Look at the Pictures, the first definitive, feature length portrait of the controversial American artist Robert Mapplethorpe, produced by Otto-Bernstein, premiered at Sundance Film Festival and Berlin International Film Festival to rave reviews. The film received a worldwide theatrical release and had its TV premiere on HBO on April 4, 2016. Mapplethorpe: Look at the Pictures was nominated for two Emmy Awards, two Critics' Choice Movie Awards, a Cinema Eye Honors Award, a Realscreen Award, a GLAAD Media Award and a Grierson Award.

In 2018, Otto-Bernstein was an executive producer on The Price of Everything, a documentary examining the role of art and artistic passion in today’s money driven, consumer-based society. The film had its world premiere at Sundance Film Festival and was released theatrically in October, followed by a TV premiere on HBO.

In 2019, Otto-Bernstein co-produced the Amazon Prime TV-Series Fur Umme, which is currently developing its second season.

In 2021, she co-produced the narrative feature Maalsund (starring Ulrich Tukur and Sibel Kekilli, Westdeutscher Rundfunk).

Otto-Bernstein is currently in pre-production on Heisenberg (directed by Uli Edel) and The Galapagos Affair (directed by Marc Rothemund).

In addition, she serves as chair of Columbia University School of the Arts Dean's Council. She was honored by her alma mater with the Columbia University Alumni Medal of Achievement in 2009.

Otto-Bernstein is a principle of Film Manufacturers Inc., an international production company that develops, produces and co-produces innovative fiction and non-fiction entertainment, with offices in New York and Munich.

Works
Mapplethorpe: Look at the Pictures (2016) - producer
Fables for Global Warming (2013). Armitage Gone! Dance. Choreography by Karole Armitage - dramaturge
"No Better Friend: Celebrities and the Dogs They Love" (2013), Edited by Elke Gazzara - writer
"Robert Wilson: The Watermill Center: A Laboratory for Performance – Robert Wilson’s Legacy" (2012),  - writer
"Absolute Wilson" (2006),  - writer
Absolute Wilson (2006) writer, director, producer
Beautopia (1998) - writer, director, producer
When Night Falls Over Moscow (1994) - writer, director
The Second Greatest Story Ever Told (1994) - director, producer
Industrialists Hall of Fame (1993) - writer, director
The Need For Speed (1993) - writer, director, producer
Coming Home (1990) - writer, director
Teething with Anger (1989) - actress

Selected awards and honors
Mapplethorpe: Look at the Pictures (2016) - Nominee for Primetime Emmy Award, Cinema Eye Award, Critics Choice Award, The Grierson Award  and GLAAD Media Award 
Columbia University Alumni Medal of Achievement (2009) 
 Absolute Wilson (2006), Winner of Art Film of the Year Award, Art Basel , Nominee for Best Documentary, Warsaw Internl. Film Festival  
Beautopia (1998) –  Winner, Best Documentary, Chicago International Film Festival, 1998., Grand Prize Nominee, Sundance Film Festival

References

External links
Film Manufacturers Inc. Website
 Absolute Wilson Website
 
 Film Manufacturers Inc. Amazon Page
 Absolute Wilson - The Biography on Amazon
 Robert Wilson Website
 Touring Repertoire - Armitage Gone! Dance
 Globe Pequot Press page for "No Better Friend: Celebrities and the Dogs They Love"
 Nathan A. Bernstein & Co. Ltd. Website

Year of birth missing (living people)
Living people
American documentary filmmakers
German emigrants to the United States
Columbia University School of the Arts alumni
American women documentary filmmakers
Columbia College (New York) alumni
Otto family
People educated at St. Clare's, Oxford